Dancesport for the 2013 Asian Indoor and Martial Arts Games was held at the Incheon Samsan World Gymnasium. It took place on the 4 and 5 July 2013.

Medalists

Standard

Latin

Medal table

Results

Standard

Five dances
5 July

Quickstep
4 July

Slow foxtrot
4 July

Tango
4 July

Waltz
4 July

Latin

Five dances
4 July

Cha-cha-cha
5 July

Jive
5 July

Paso doble
5 July

Samba
5 July

References

External links
 

2013
2013 Asian Indoor and Martial Arts Games events
Asian